The Juno Cup of 2011 was an ice hockey game in Toronto, Ontario on 25 March 2011. It was the eight annual such competition, which is a charitable event held in conjunction with the 2011 Juno Awards.

The NHL Greats, former professional hockey players, won the game 13–10 over The Rockers.

A training camp for the players was held at the Ricoh Coliseum, the game venue, on 8 February 2011.

Roster
Competing teams consist of the NHL Greats (NHL players) and The Rockers (musicians).

NHL Greats

 Valeri Bure
 Paul Coffey
 Russ Courtnall
 Troy Crowder
 Brad Dalgarno
 Curtis Joseph
 Derek King
 Gary Leeman
 Mark Napier
 Mike Pelyk
 Gary Roberts

Rockers

 Tyler Armes
 Paul Aucoin
 Mike Belitsky
 Barney Bentall
 Dustin Bentall
 Jay Bodner
 DJ Mike Boyd
 George Canyon
 Classified
 Bryan Crouch
 Jim Cuddy
 Sean Dean
 Kathleen Edwards
 Vince Fontaine
 Jon Gallant
 Sarah Harmer
 Rob Higgins (Dearly Beloved)
 Brad Keller (Creaking Tree String Quartet)
 Peter Kesper
 Brian Kobayakawa (Creaking Tree String Quartet)
 Ron MacLean (Hockey Night in Canada)
 Johnny Max (Johnny Max Band)
 Chris Murphy
 Greg Millson
 Kevin Parent
 Andrew Scott
 Menno Versteeg

References

External links
 Juno Cup official site

Juno Cup
Ice hockey in Newfoundland and Labrador
Juno